Portugal competed at the 1960 Summer Olympics in Rome, Italy. A delegation of sixty five competitors participated in a record number of eleven sports, with the Star sailing team winning an Olympic silver medal, the second in Portugal's history.

Medalists

Silver
 José Quina and Mário Quina — Sailing, Star.

Athletics

Men's 3000m Steeplechase:
 Joaquim Ferreira — 1st round: 11th (heat 1)

Men's 5000m:
 Manuel Oliveira — 1st round: 6th (heat 2)

Men's Decathlon:
 Júlio Santos — DNF (2282 points)
 100m — 12,0 (597)
 Long Jump — 6,32 (592)
 Shot Put — 10,85 (488)
 High Jump — 1,65 (605)
 400m — DNF
 110m Hurdles — DNS
 Discus Throw — DNS
 Pole Vault — DNS
 Javelin Throw — DNS
 1500m — DNS

Men's Hammer Throw:
 Eduardo Martins — qualifiers (54,92)

Men's Long Jump:
 Pedro de Almeida — qualifiers (7,10)

Cycling

Individual road race
 Francisco Valada — 77th - 142nd
 José Pacheco — 77th - 142nd
 Mário Silva — 77th - 142nd
 Ramiro Martins — 77th - 142nd

Team time trial
 Francisco Valada, José Pacheco, Mário Silva and Ramiro Martins — 25th (2:33.19,61)

Equestrian

Men's Individual Dressage:
 António Nogueira — 10th (948 points)
 Luís Mena e Silva — 17th (775 points)

Men's Individual Eventing:
 Álvaro Sabbo — eliminated 
 Joaquim Duarte Silva — eliminated
 Jorge Eduardo Mathias — eliminated
 Mário Delgado — 35th (−705,15 points)

Men's Team Eventing:
 Álvaro Sabbo, Joaquim Duarte Silva, Jorge Eduardo Mathias and Mário Delgado — eliminated

Men's Individual Jumping:
 António Pereira de Almeida — eliminated
 Henrique Alves Calado — 11th (32 points)
 Carlos Lopes João — eliminated

Men's Team Jumping:
 António Pereira de Almeida, Carlos Lopes João and Henrique Alves Calado — eliminated

Fencing

Nine fencers, eight men and one woman, represented Portugal in 1960.

Men's foil
 Orlando Azinhais — 1st round: 6th (poule 1)
 Pedro Marçal — 1st round: 7th (poule 2)
 Manuel Borrego

Men's épée
 José Fernandes — eighths-of-final: 6th (poule 4) 
 José de Albuquerque — 1st round: 7th (poule 10)
 José Ferreira — eighths-of-final: 5th (poule 1)

Men's team épée
 José Fernandes, José de Albuquerque, José Ferreira and Manuel Borrego — 1st round: 3rd (poule 1)

Men's sabre
 António Marquilhas — 1st round: 6th (poule 6)
 Joaquim Rodrigues — 1st round: 4th (poule 10)
 Orlando Azinhais — 1st round: 5th (poule 1)

Men's team sabre
 António Marquilhas, José Fernandes, Joaquim Rodrigues, José Ferreira, Orlando Azinhais — 1st round: 3rd (poule 4)

Women's foil
 Maria Nápoles — 1st round: 6th (poule 1)

Gymnastics

Men's Individual Competition:
 Hermenegildo Candeias — 120th (87,65 points)
 Horizontal Bar — 114th (15,20)
 Parallel Bars — 116th (15,30)
 Pommelled Horse — 106th (15,65)
 Rings — 116th (16,20)
 Vault — 129th (8,75)
 Floor — 111th (16,55)

Women's Individual Competition:
 Dália Vairinho Cunha Sammer — 109th (59,165)
 Vault — 91st (16,166)
 Asymmetrical Bars — 115th (12,933)
 Beam — 110th (14,566)
 Floor — 109th (15,500)
 Esbela Fonseca — 116th (55,431 points)
 Vault — 120th (10,733)
 Asymmetrical Bars — 115th (12,933)
 Beam — 117th (13,766)
 Floor — 112th (15,066)
 Maria Cunha — 119th (53,163 points)
 Vault — 122nd (9,099)
 Asymmetrical Bars — 115th (12,933)
 Beam — 113th (14,432)
 Floor — 105th (15,766)

Rowing

Portugal had 5 male rowers participate in one out of seven rowing events in 1960.

 Men's coxed four
 Ilídio Silva, Jorge Gavinho, José Porto, José Vieira and Rui Valença (cox) — repechage: 3rd (poule 1)

Sailing

Men's Finn:
 Hélder de Oliveira — 15th (3488 points)

Men's Flying Dutchman:
 Carlos Braga and Gabriel da Silva Lopes — 27th (1279 points)

Men's Star:
 José Quina and Mário Quina — 2nd (6665 points)

Men's Dragon:
 Carlos Francisco Ferreira, Gonçalo Mello, Joaquim Pinto Basto — 9th (4051 points)

Men's 5,5m:
 Duarte de Almeida Bello, Fernando Pinto Coelho Bello and Júlio de Sousa Leite Gorinho — 16th (1667 points)

Shooting

Nine shooters represented Portugal in 1960.

25 m pistol
 António Martins — 50th (537 marks)
 Rogério Tavares — 49th (542 marks)

50 m pistol
 André Antunes — 54th (489 marks)
 António Jorge — 36th (522 marks)

50 m rifle, three positions
 António Tavares — 1st round: 29th (group 2)
 Manoel da Silva — 1st round: 32nd (group 1)

50 m rifle, prone
 Albino da Silva — 1st round: 35th (group 2)
 César Batista — 1st round: 30th (group 1) (378 marks)

Trap
 Guy de Valle Flor — 15th (180)

Swimming

Men's 100m Backstroke:
 Raul Cerqueira — 1st round: 7th (heat 1)

Men's 200m Butterfly:
 Luís Vaz Jorge — 1st round: 5th (heat 3)

Men's 100m Freestyle:
 Herlander Ribeiro — 1st round: 5th (heat 1)

Men's 400m Freestyle:
 Eduardo de Sousa — 1st round: 7th (heat 3)

Men's 1500m Freestyle:
 Eduardo de Sousa — 1st round: 5th (heat 5)

Men's 4×100m Medley:
 Eduardo de Sousa, Herlander Ribeiro, Luís Vaz Jorge and Raul Cerqueira — 1st round: 6th (heat 3)

Women's 200m Breaststroke:
 Maria Freitas Veloso — 1st round: 7th (heat 4)

Weightlifting

Men's Bantamweight (–57 kg):
 Luís Paquete — 19th (245 points)

Wrestling

Men's Greco-Roman Bantamweight (–57 kg):
 Orlando Gonçalves — 17th (−6 points)

Men's Greco-Roman Featherweight (–62 kg):
 José Gregório — 22nd (−8 points)

Men's Greco-Roman Middleweight (–79 kg):
 Luis Caldas — 21st (−8 points)

Officials
 Correia Leal (chief of mission)
 Bernardo Mendes de Almeida (sailing)
 Castro de Seixa (women's gymnastics)

References

External links
Official Olympic Reports
International Olympic Committee results database

Nations at the 1960 Summer Olympics
1960
1960 in Portuguese sport